Asnan bin Ahmad (born 3 May 1993) is a Malaysian professional footballer who plays as a defensive midfielder for Penang.

Career statistics

Club

References

1993 births
Living people
Malaysian footballers
Malaysia Super League players
UKM F.C. players
Terengganu FC players
Kedah Darul Aman F.C. players
Penang F.C. players
People from Kedah
Malaysian people of Malay descent
Association football midfielders